Christopher Panzner (born 1959) is an American artist/writer/producer living and working in France. He has worked for a number of pioneers in the television and film industry, notably as Technical Director for the inventor of interactive television shopping, the Home Shopping Network and as Operations Director, France, for the inventor of the colorization process for black-and-white films, Color Systems Technology. He has developed animation software (Pixibox), designed theme channels (Canal +) and was managing director of the Luxembourg-based studio, Luxanima, which shared an International Emmy in 1994 for French CGI series Insektors, the first computer-generated TV series ever made. He went on to set up an animation/FX studio (motion capture/motion control), Image Effects, where he supervised the creation of 2D animated series The Tidings for Entertainment Rights before creating his own studio in the east of France the following year, Talkie Walkie, specializing in pre-production (design, storyboard and layout) and computer production (ink-and-paint/compositing) and whose clients included a Who's Who of international television animation producers such as SIP, RTV Family Entertainment, Alphanim (now called Gaumont Animation) and Cinar (bought by WildBrain.) He joined Paris-based production company TEVA in 2001 and was instrumental in the financing and/or the making of five animated features there in 2002–2004: double-Oscar nominated The Triplets of Belleville, Venice Film Festival selection The Dog, the General and the Birds written by Tonino Guerra (L'Avventura, Blow-Up, Zabriskie Point, Amarcord, Ginger and Fred, etc.), Jester Till produced by Oscar-winning Eberhard Junkersdorf (for Best Foreign Film, The Tin Drum), Blackmor’s Treasure (Associate Producer) and T'choupi (Co-Producer). In 2002, TEVA and Mistral Films won the grand prize at IMAGINA for an experimental short film, The Tale of the Floating World directed by Alain Escalle, beating such prestigious competition as Shrek, Amélie and The Lord of the Rings, and was entirely responsible for the fabrication of Storimages’ Pulcinella-winning and International Emmy-nominated special, Marcelin Caillou, based on the book by famous French illustrator Jean-Jacques Sempé. In 2006, The Triplets of Belleville, The Dog, the General and the Pigeons and Blackmor’s Treasure were part of an eight-film retrospective of contemporary French animation at the Museum of Modern Art in New York called "Grand Illusions: The Best of Recent French Animation."

Mr. Panzner has written original animated television shows, adapted into English a number of other television shows and feature films and writes regularly for Animation World Network, Animation Magazine, ASIFA, Stylus Magazine, Arts Editor, Artnow Online,  etc. As of 2022, he has written 55 original episodes of television animated series including Pulcinella-winning and International Emmy-nominated series (31 episodes + 2 specials) Angelo Rules! (TeamTo), Taking Down Taffy! (Cybergroup), Pat the Dog and The New Adventures of Geronimo Stilton (Superprod), Angry Birds (Rovio), The Popples (Method Films), Babar and the Adventures of Badou (Nelvana), etc.

In 2005, he developed a series (5 X 52') of high-definition television documentaries on communication with animals, Talk to Me, and two one-hour specials, The Hermione and Lafayette, about the reconstruction of the ship the Marquis de Lafayette sailed to America on during the American Revolutionary War for Woods TV, Paris.  He also did the English adaptation of Michel Fessler's, author of Academy Award for Best Documentary Feature March of the Penguins, latest feature film in development Henri Bosco's L'Enfant et la Rivière.

In 2006, Mr. Panzner was Director, Short Form Programming for Discovery Communications and was responsible for the development and production of math (80 X 10’) and social studies (100 X 5’) shorts for Discovery Education's www.unitedstreaming.com. As part of his responsibilities, he also did development of short form programming for the diverse Discovery networks and new media platforms.

Since leaving Discovery, Mr. Panzner has dedicated his time to the development of a new audiovisual industry he has invented, "Re:Naissance"  is a revolutionary new concept in animation, conceived as a means of transforming aging catalog and archives into salable, low-cost, high quality audiovisual products. For the first time ever in the 100-year history of animation, Re:Naissance  is going to invert the adaptation process by taking existing live-action films and faithfully reproducing them in animation, in a totally original graphic style unique to every film. As astonishing as it might sound, this has never been done. The first Re:Naissance film is George A. Romero's 1968 cult horror classic Night of the Living Dead.

In the Spring of 2010 (March 12-April 17), he also had his first one-man show of drawings/collages in Paris, "Décollage", at Etains du Campanile (95 rue de Seine.)

As an illustrator, a work of his was included in "The Graphic Canon: The Definitive Anthology of the World's Great Literature as Comics and Visuals" from an adaptation of Lewis Carroll's Alice's Adventures in Wonderland, exclusively in images, "What is the Use of a Book Without Pictures". One of his works was also included in a special traveling exhibition of "Guard Dog: Global Jam" (2011), a shot-by-shot remake of Bill Plympton’s Oscar-nominated short Guard Dog (film)  where each sequence was assigned to "a willing volunteer who would reanimate it in any chosen style or medium." Described as "a flicker frame extravaganza where every individual frame was outsourced to a different artist to interpret in their own way," the sequence the still is from a collaboration within a collaboration, the same people who spearheaded the similar mass collaboration project "Night of the Living Dead: Reanimated." "Guard Dog: Global Jam" won the award for Best Experimental Animation at ASIFA-EAST 2011.

Mr. Panzner created New Art and Culture magazine LHOOQ in 2011, a vanity project, featuring Michael Holman ("Subculturist Michael Holman: Historical Revisionism and the Politically Correct in Hip Hop/Downtown.")  LHOOQ magazine is part of Michael Holman's archive bought by the New York Public Library for the Performing Arts, the first Hip Hop collection in its holdings. In 2018, an article appeared describing Panzner's friendship with Jean-Michel Basquiat and Matt Dike (and the curious link between those two) at Phillips Auction House, "Got the Time: Matt Dike & Jean‐Michel Basquiat" by Peter Relic.

He is currently a freelance writer and illustrator and recently completed his first solo illustration project (2015), a mash-up of French illustrator Gustave Doré’s collected works for Friedrich Nietzsche's masterpiece Thus Spake Zarathustra. The 103 illustrations ink drawings, done to resemble engravings, correspond to the approximately 90 chapters of the work (as well as title page, frontispiece, chapters, etc.) Twelve illustrations appeared in Evergreen Review in an article by Robert Guffey called "Donald Trump's Operation Mindfuck" (Election Day, 2020).

A series of fifty-five watercolor and ink Illustrations commemorating Jack Kerouac’s Beat Generation classic called "The Illustrated On the Road", has been approved by the Jack Kerouac Estate  and is on permanent loan to their website. The series debuted on Kerouac's ninety-eighth birthday on March 12, 2020, fifty years after his passing (October 21, 1969.) The Evergreen Review featured ten of these illustrations from The Illustrated "On the Road", celebrating Jack Kerouac's Centenniel on March 12, 2022.

References

American film producers
1959 births
Living people